Tlaloc's leopard frog (Lithobates tlaloci), or rana de Tláloc in Spanish, is a species of frog in the family Ranidae endemic to the Valley of Mexico. It is most likely extinct.

Tlaloc's leopard frog inhabited wetland areas in the surroundings of southern Mexico City. The suitable habitat disappeared because of rapid urbanization.

References

Lithobates
Endemic amphibians of Mexico
Fauna of the Trans-Mexican Volcanic Belt
Amphibians described in 1985
Taxonomy articles created by Polbot